Lilian Franck (born March 11, 1971) is a German film director and producer, best known for her 2010 documentary Pianomania, a collaborative work with filmmaker Robert Cibis and winner of the Golden Gate Award for Best Documentary at the San Francisco International Film Festival, the German Film Award for Best Sound Design in 2011 and the Semaine De La Critique prize at the Locarno International Film Festival.

Education 
Franck was born on March 11, 1971, in Würzberg, Germany. She studied at the Filmakademie Baden-Württemberg and at Le Fresnoy - Studio National des Arts Contemporains in France.

Career 
In 2002, she received the German–French Journalist Award (de) for her documentary Half A Chance? (2002), her first with co-director and collaborator Robert Cibis. Franck and Cibis co-founded OVALmedia. Their first project producing and directing together was Human Capital - The Employment Trade (2007). Later in 2007, their project Disgustingly Healthy, an exposé on the use of leeches and maggots in Western medicine, was awarded the Ektopfilm Award. Their 2009 documentary film Pianomania depicts the collaboration between piano technician Stefan Knüper and pianists including Pierre-Laurent Aimard, Alfred Brendel and Lang Lang; it had a successful theatrical release and was screened in theatres in over 25 countries worldwide, as well as over 100 countries on television.  Pianomania was awarded the Semaine De La Critique prize at the Locarno International Film Festival, the Golden Gate award at the San Francisco International Film Festival and the German Film Award for Best Sound Design.

In 2016, Franck and Cibis produced and distributed Free Lunch Society (directed by Christian Tod), which opened in 100 German cinemas and venues in February in a large-scale crowdsourced premiere event, whereby members of the public were invited to receive copies of the film to hold their own public screenings. This was coordinated by Franck in association with Mein Grundeinkommen.

In February 2018, Franck's film trustWHO, a report on the influence of privatised industry on the World Health Organisation, was released in German cinemas nationwide. An additional project, a co-production and co-direction between Franck and Cibis, Fuck Fame, a biopic of the indie-rap musician, Uffie, is slated for release in 2019.

Filmography

Feature films 
 Pianomania (2009)
 Free Lunch Society (Co-producer & Distributor) (2016)
 trustWHO (2018)
 Fuck Fame (2018)

Short films 
 Omen - 15 Hours of Techno (1994)
 Clemi Escapes (1994)
 Supermerle (1997)
 Cora (2000)
 I Love Me, I Love Me Not (Producer) (2003)
 Anyway Home (Producer) (2015)
 J'ai Tout Donné Au Soleil Sauf Mon Ombre (Producer) (2015)

Video installation 
 Spin The World (2000)

Television 
 Half A Chance? (2003)
 Human Capital - The Employment Trade (2007)
 Disgustingly Healthy (Producer) (2009)
 Preying On Patients (Producer) (2009)
 The Pill: Atom Bomb of Contraception (Producer) (2010)
 Kids On Pills (2010)
 Virus vs. Bacteria - A Way Out Of The Antibiotics Crisis (Producer) (2011)

Awards

References

External links

1971 births
Living people
Film directors from Würzburg
German women film directors
German film producers
German women film producers